Durganagar railway station is a Kolkata Suburban Railway station in Durganagar. It's code is DGNR. It serves Durganagar areas. The station consists of two platforms. The platform is not very well sheltered. It lacks many facilities including water and sanitation.

Station

Location
Durganagar is located on Sealdah–Hasnabad–Bangaon–Ranaghat line of Kolkata Suburban Railway. Link between Dum Dum to Khulna now in Bangladesh, via Bangaon was constructed by Bengal Central Railway Company in 1882–84. The Sealah–Dum Dum–Barasat–Ashok Nagar–Bangaon sector was electrified in 1963–64.

Layout

See also

References

External links 

 Durganagar Station Map

Sealdah railway division
Railway stations in North 24 Parganas district
Transport in Kolkata
Kolkata Suburban Railway stations